Marie-France is a French feminine given name. Notable people with the name include:

 Marie-France (actress) (born 1943), French actress
 Marie-France Bazzo, Canadian broadcaster
 Marie-France Beaufils (born 1946), member of the Senate of France
 Marie-France Dubreuil (born 1974), Canadian ice dancer
 Marie-France Dufour (1949–1990), French singer
 Marie-France Garcia (born 1946), French singer and actress
 Marie-France Gaite (1941–1968), French singer
 Marie-France Hirigoyen (born 1949), French psychiatrist, psychoanalyst and psychotherapist
 Marie-France Lalonde (born 1971), Canadian politician
 Marie-France Larouche (born 1980), Canadian curler
 Marie-France Lorho (born 1964), French politician
 Marie-France Mignal (born 1940), French actress
 Marie-France Pisier (born 1944), French actress
 Marie-France Plumer (born 1943), French actress
 Marie-France Stirbois (1944–2006), French National Front politician

See also 

 Marie (given name)
 France (name)

Given names
Feminine given names
French feminine given names
Compound given names